Baulon (Gallo: Baulon) is a commune in the Ille-et-Vilaine department in Brittany in northwestern France.

History
Stone axes found in various locations in Baulon - Crambert, Métairies, Champs-du-Four, and Boutard - suggest that the area was inhabited from the Neolithic period.

In the first centuries AD, the Romans occupied Brittany and established a camp in Baulon, in Châtellier, close to the road running from Rennes to Vannes.

After the fall of the Roman Empire in the west, the Bretons, chased out of Great Britain by the Anglo-Saxons, took refuge in Amorica, which became Brittany. In Baulon, they established a monastery. In addition to the monastery, Baulon also possesses another center of worship, which the current market town was built around.

This was done in the parish of Baulon in Porhoët.

In the 14th century, the lordship belonged to the lords of Baulon. The coat of arms of Baulon is dated to 1378. The Baulon family ended at the end of the 15th century, succeeded by the Brullon family.

The Brullons built markets and organized fairs from 1574. In 1584, Pierre Brullon received from King Henry III of France the right to render justice in the lordship of the Musse. He built "la maison de la geôle" that served as a court of justice and prison.

In the 18th century, three important fairs were held in Baulon: February 4 for the Feast of Saint Blaise, July 26 for the Feast of Saint Anne, and September 14 for the Feast of the Cross.

The inhabitants of the town supported the changes brought by the French Revolution, especially after the end of the Reign of Terror. The main revolutionary holiday, celebrated from 1795, was one celebrating the anniversary of the execution of Louis XVI, which was accompanied by an oath of hatred to royalty and anarchy. Baulon also celebrated the creation of the Republic.

Population

See also
Communes of the Ille-et-Vilaine department

References

External links

Official site

Mayors of Ille-et-Vilaine Association 

Communes of Ille-et-Vilaine